Peribunyaviridae is a family of viruses in the order Bunyavirales.  Its name partially derives from Bunyamwera, Uganda, where the founding species was first isolated.

Unclassifed viruses

A number of viruses that belong to this family have yet to be classified. These include Akhtuba virus, Fulton virus, Khurdun virus, Lakamha virus, largemouth bass bunyavirus, and Eriocheir sinensis bunya-like virus.

References

External links
 ICTV Report: Peribunyaviridae

 
Virus families
Bunyavirales